I'm Yours is a studio album by Jamaican Reggae musician Sizzla. It was released on August 11, 2017 and produced by JonFX. It features 11 tracks and was supported by the lead single I'm yours. It includes a guest appearance from Stonebwoy and Mz Vee. The album experiments with a variety of genres, such as afro pop, tropical house, and ska.

The album peaked at number 2 on the US Billboard Charts Top Reggae Albums and number 4 on US Billboard Heatseekers Albums (South Atlantic) Charts  first-week.

Personnel
 Sizzla – primary artist, songwriter
 Jon FX – producer
 Jean Michel Padilla – mixing engineer
 Lmr Pro - mixing engineer
 Koen Heldens – mixing engineer, mastering engineer

Charts

References

2017 albums
Sizzla albums